The Herbie Mann String Album is an album by American jazz flautist Herbie Mann recorded for the Atlantic label and released in 1967.

Reception

AllMusic awarded the album 3 stars.

Track listing
All compositions by Herbie Mann except as indicated
 "To Sir, With Love" (Mark London, Don Black) - 2:33
 "Hold Back (Just a Little)" - 3:00
 "Sports Car" - 3:32
 "I Get Along Without You Very Well" (Hoagy Carmichael) - 4:01
 "There Is a Mountain" (Donovan Leitch) - 2:02
 "Flight of the Bluebird" (Torrie Zito) - 4:18
 "Yesterday's Kisses" - 4:19
 "Please Send Me Someone to Love" (Percy Mayfield) - 6:06
 "It Was a Very Good Year" (Ervin Drake) - 4:34
 "Gloomy Sunday" (Rezső Seress, Sam M. Lewis) - 4:22 	
Recorded in New York City on April 5, 1966 (tracks 3, 4 & 10), April 6, 1966 (tracks 2 & 6), April 7, 1966 (tracks 7-9) and September 21, 1967 (tracks 1 & 5)

Personnel 
Herbie Mann - flute
Jimmy Owens (tracks 2-4 & 6-10), Clark Terry (tracks 1 & 5) - trumpet, flugelhorn 
Dave Ecker - trombone (tracks 1 & 5)
Ray Alonge, Julius Watkins - French horn (tracks 1 & 5)
Gloria Agostini - harp (tracks 2-4, 6 & 10)
Gene Bertoncini (tracks 2-4, 6 & 10), Bucky Pizzarelli (tracks 1 & 5), Wally Richardson (tracks 1 & 5) - guitar
Richard Davis - bass (tracks 2-4 & 6-10)
Bruno Carr (tracks 2 & 6), Mel Lewis (tracks 3, 4 & 7-10), Herbie Lovelle (tracks 1 & 5), Don McDonald (tracks 7-9) - drums
Ray Barretto (tracks 1 & 5), Carlos "Patato" Valdes (tracks 2-4 & 6-10), Phil Kraus (Tracks 2-4 & 6-10), Ted Sommer (tracks 1 & 5), Orestes Vilato (tracks 1 & 5) - percussion
Anahid Ajemian, Alfred Brown, Bernard Eichen, Leo Kahn, Leo Kruczek, Charles Libove, Dave Markowitz, Charles McCracken, Marvin Morgenstern, David Nadien, George Ockner, Raoul Poliakin, Max Pollikoff, George Ricci, Aaron Rosand, Alan Shulman, Sylvan Shulman, Tosha Tamaroff, Karen Tuttle, Emanuel Vardi, Jack Zayde - string section
Arif Mardin (tracks 1 & 5), Torrie Zito (tracks 2-4, 6-10) - arranger, conductor
Technical
Tom Dowd - engineer
Haig Adishian - design
Jerry Schatzberg - photography

References 

1967 albums
Herbie Mann albums
Albums produced by Nesuhi Ertegun
Atlantic Records albums
Albums arranged by Arif Mardin
Albums arranged by Torrie Zito